P.A.O.K. B.C. history and statistics in the FIBA and ULEB competitions.

Matches

1: The game interrupted against PAOK at the beginning of the extra time. PAOK's coach Johnny Neumann push the Italian referee Grossi, when he impute breach at jump all. 
2: Red Star was drawn for the competition but was not allowed to compete due to United Nations embargo on Federal Republic of Yugoslavia. PAOK went through with a walkover.
3: PAOK didn't show up to the match, so Türk Telekom was awarded a 20–0 walkover. Later, PAOK withdrawn from the competition.

Statistics

Achievements

Overall record

 PAOK has two walkover wins out of 224 and one walkover defeat out of 177.

Biggest wins and defeats

1: PAOK showed up to the match with only five players, three of them from the youth team.

Matches in overtime

 Note: The game interrupted against PAOK at the beginning of the extra time. PAOK's American coach Johnny Neumann push the Italian referee Grossi, when he impute breach at jump all.

Opponents by country

See also
 Greek basketball clubs in European competitions

References
 Eurobasket PAOK BC Page

External links
PAOK B.C. Official Website 
PAOK Thessaloniki History – PAOK Thessaloniki History Provided On Behalf Of Melbourne Club PAOK
PAOKworld- Most informative PAOK Thessaloniki Forum 
PAOKmania – PAOK Thessaloniki Supporters Downloads, Radio and News 

P.A.O.K. BC